Trzebiatowski (masculine), Trzebiatowska (feminine) is a Polish language family name. Notable people with the surname include:

Włodzimierz Trzebiatowski (1906–1982), Polish chemist, physicist and mathematician
 Jörg "Tritze" Trzebiatowski, a musician of a German band Kreator
Marta Żmuda Trzebiatowska (born 1984), Polish film, television and theater actress
Anna Łajming née Anna Żmuda Trzebiatowska (born 1904), Polish (Kashubian) writer

Polish-language surnames